KTLR (890 AM, "Community Talk 890 AM") is a commercial radio station in Oklahoma City with a talk radio format. The station is currently under ownership of Tyler Media Group, through licensee Tyler Media, L.L.C. Most shows are brokered programming, where hosts pays for time on the station, and can discuss products or services they sell.

KTLR broadcasts by day at 1,000 watts using a non-directional antenna. Because it shares the same frequency as Class A clear channel station WLS in Chicago, KTLR is a daytimer and must sign off at sunset to avoid interfering with WLS, because radio waves travel further at night. Programming can be heard around the clock on KTLR's FM translator station, K279CR, at 103.7 MHz.

History
The station's original call sign was KBYE, signing on the air in 1945. It was one of OKC's first African-American formatted stations for many years. The tower, before moving to Britton Rd. and Eastern was located on the same property as Remington Park at approx. 55th and N. Eastern. The studio was located at 9th and Broadway downtown, where the Murrah Bombing site is now. Ownership for many years was by the Lynch brothers.

Under Tyler ownership, the station was then known as KKNG beginning in 1999. On August 30, 2008, the station changed its call sign to the current KTLR.

It carried an Urban Gospel format before making its switch to the current talk format in 2007.

Translators

References

External links

FCC History Cards for KTLR

TLR
News and talk radio stations in the United States
Radio stations established in 1945
1945 establishments in Oklahoma
TLR